Methodist Tabernacle is a historic Methodist tabernacle located near Mathews, Mathews County, Virginia. It was built in 1922, and is a large, open pavilion with a hipped roof surmounted by a hipped clerestory monitor with wooden shutters.  The building has 21 rows of wooden benches on the dirt floor arranged along three aisles. The building is a rare example in Virginia of an early 20th century revival meeting facility.

It was listed on the National Register of Historic Places in 1975.

References

Churches on the National Register of Historic Places in Virginia
Churches completed in 1922
Buildings and structures in Mathews County, Virginia
National Register of Historic Places in Mathews County, Virginia
Methodism in Virginia
Tabernacles (Methodist)